= International Folklore Children's Festival "Oro Bez Granici" =

Folklore festival

The International Folklore Children’s Festival "Oro Bez Granici" (Macedonian: Меѓународен фолклорен детски фестивал "Оро Без Граници", Megjunaroden folkloren detski festival "Oro Bez Granici") is a festival taking place every year between 29 September and 2 October in the Universal Hall in Skopje, Republic of North Macedonia. In this festival, children’s folklore ensembles from North Macedonia and abroad participate.
